Song Defu may refer to:
 Song Defu (politician)
 Song Defu (footballer)